Nena Jolidon-Croake (1865–1934) was an American politician and one of the first two women elected to the Washington State Legislature, representing the 37th Legislative District from Tacoma, Washington.

Early life and career

Jolidon-Croake worked as a physician. She served as President of the Washington Equal Suffrage Society and supported the 1910 amendment which gave women the right to vote in Washington.

Political career
Jolidon-Croake ran for office in 1913 after passage of Washington's Fifth Amendment, providing women the right to vote.

Her first bill sought to improve women's working conditions.

References

1865 births
1934 deaths
Members of the Washington House of Representatives
Women state legislators in Washington (state)
Politicians from Tacoma, Washington
Washington (state) Progressives (1912)